Right Here may refer to:

Albums 
 Right Here (Eddie Money album), 1991
 Right Here (Boh Runga album), 2009
 Right Here (Shane Filan album), 2015
 Right Here (Charles Billingsley album), 2016

Songs 
 "Right Here" (Jeremy Camp song), 2002
 "Right Here" (Jess Glynne song), 2014
 "Right Here" (Justin Bieber song), 2012
 "Right Here" (Rudimental song), 2013
 "Right Here" (Staind song), 2005
 "Right Here" (SWV song), 1992
 "Right Here" (The Go-Betweens song), 1987
 "Right Here (Departed)", a 2008 song by Brandy Norwood
 "Right Here", by Chase Atlantic from Part One, 2017
 "Right Here", by James Morrison from Higher Than Here, 2015
 "Right Here", by Miley Cyrus from Meet Miley Cyrus, 2007
 "Right Here", by Shalamar from The Look, 1983
 "Right Here", by Shane Filan from Right Here, 2015
 "Right Here", by The Story So Far from What You Don't See, 2013
 "Right Here", by Zara Larsson from Poster Girl, 2021

See also
 Right Here Tour, a 2016 concert tour by Shane Filan
 "I'm Right Here", a 2002 song by Samantha Mumba
 Right Here, Right Now (disambiguation)